Brahma Nayudu is a 1987 Indian Telugu-language action drama film directed by Dasari Narayana Rao. The film stars Krishnam Raju, Sujatha and Suhasini. The music was composed by J. V. Raghavulu.
This is actor Srihari's debut movie.

Cast
Krishnam Raju as Brahma Nayudu
Sujatha as Brahma Nayudu's sister
Suhasini
Gummadi
Kaikala Satyanarayana
Srihari

Music

References

External links

1987 films
1980s action drama films
Indian action drama films
Films directed by Dasari Narayana Rao
Films scored by J. V. Raghavulu
1980s Telugu-language films
1987 drama films